Khalilullah Khalili (1907 – 1987; Pashto/  - Ḫalīlallāḥ Ḫalīlī; alternative spellings: Khalilollah, Khalil Ullah) was Afghanistan's foremost 20th century poet as well as a noted historian, university professor, diplomat and royal confidant. 
He was the last of the great classical Persian poets and among the first to introduce modern Persian poetry and Nimai style to Afghanistan. He had also expertise in Khorasani style and was a follower of Farrukhi Sistani. Almost alone among Afghanistan's poets, he enjoyed a following in Iran where his selected poems have been published. His works have been praised by renowned Iranian literary figures and intellectuals. Many see him as the greatest contemporary poet of the Persian language in Afghanistan. He is also known for his major work "Hero of Khorasan", a controversial biography of Habībullāh Kalakānī, Emir of Afghanistan in 1929.

Life
Khalili was born in Kabul Province, and came from the same village as Habibullah Kalakani. He wrote exclusively in Persian and is from the mixed ethnicity of Tajiks from his father's side and on his mother's side a Safi Pashtun from eastern Afghanistan. Lynch, Stephen (2003) "Tulips in a Minefield" Afghan Relief p.3 , originally published, on 12 October 2003 in the Orange County Register, last accessed 17 January 2009</ref>
He was from Kohistan (modern Parwan). His father, Mirzā Muhammad Hussein Khān, was King Habibullah Khan's finance minister and owned mansions in Kabul and Jalalabad, but was later dismissed and hanged by Habibullah Khan's son and successor, Amanullah Khan. His mother was the daughter of Abdul Qādir Khān, a regional Safi tribal leader. She died when Khalili was seven.

Khalili lived and attended school in Kabul until he was 11, when Shāh Habibullāh Khān, king of Afghanistan, was assassinated, purportedly at the behest of his reformist son Amānullāh Khān, who quickly arrested and executed Khalili's father among others associated with the previous regime. Orphaned and unwanted in Kabul, he spent the turbulent years of Amānullāh's reign in the Shamālī Plain north of Kabul where he studied classical literature and other traditional sciences with leading scholars and began writing poetry. In 1929, when Habībullāh Kalakānī – a local Tajik from Kalakan – deposed Amānullāh Khān, Khalili joined his uncle Abdul Rahim Khan Safi, the new governor of Herat, where he remained for more than 10 years.

In the early 1940s, he followed his uncle Abdul Rahim Khan Safi, who had been appointed a deputy prime minister, to Kabul. His stay in Kabul was cut short when, in 1944, some elders of the Safi-Clan rebelled and both uncle and nephew were imprisoned. After a year in prison, Khalili was released and exiled to Kandahar where he flourished as a poet and writer.

In the 1950s, Khalili was allowed to return to Kabul, where he was appointed as minister of culture and information and began teaching at Kabul University. He became a confidant to King Zahir Shah whom he often joined on hunting expeditions.

In the 1960s and 1970s, Khalili, who was fluent in Arabic, served as Afghanistan's ambassador to Saudi Arabia and Iraq. He was a member of the 1964 Constitutional Assembly and a representative from Jabal al-Siraj.

Following the April 1978 Communist coup, Khalili sought asylum first in Western Germany and then in the United States where he wrote much of his most powerful poetry about the war in his native land. In the late 1980s, he moved to Islamabad, Pakistan, where he spent his final years. He was buried in Peshawar next to the tomb of the Pashto poet Rahman Baba.
His remains were moved to Afghanistan in 2016.  
Burial:
Kabul University mausoleum 
Kabul
Kabul, Afghanistan

Works
Khalili was a prolific writer, producing over the course of his career an eclectic repertoire ranging from poetry to fiction to history to biography. He published 35 volumes of poetry, including his celebrated works "Aškhā wa Ḫūnhā" ("Tears And Blood"), composed during the Soviet occupation, and "Ayyār-e az Ḫorāsān" ("Hero of Khorasan"). With the exception of a selection of his quatrains and the recent An Assembly of Moths, his poetry remains largely unknown to English-speaking readers.

References

External links
An  article  by Said Ehsan in the Lamar-Aftaab online magazine
"Restoring Poetry to Afghanistan" by Steve Coll
"Bitter Fruit Falling" by Khalilullah Khalili
"He Is With You Wherever You Are"

See also

 Persian poetry
 Massoud Khalili (son)
 Nima Yushij
 Wasef Bakhtari

Tajik poets
20th-century Persian-language writers
Afghan writers
1987 deaths
1907 births
20th-century Afghan poets
Ambassadors of Afghanistan to Saudi Arabia
Ambassadors of Afghanistan to Iraq
Afghan expatriates in Pakistan